Rockland is the name of several communities in the U.S. state of West Virginia.

Rockland, Greenbrier County, West Virginia
Rockland, Hardy County, West Virginia